The National Theatre of Szeged is the main theatre of Szeged, Hungary. It was built in 1883 by the well-known company of Ferdinand Fellner and Hermann Helmer in Eclectic and Neo-baroque style.

Theatre in Szeged
The last decades of the 19th century saw a surge of population in Szeged, thus the plays given by travelling companies (both Hungarian and German) rose rapidly. Plays were conducted in the upper city temple, and appropriate larger halls, like on the upper levels of the city council, until a dedicated smaller hall was opened for these purposes. This building represented significant fire hazard from 1823 onwards, and was demolished in 1847. While theatrical plays continued in club houses, and a small theatre in the later Színház street, from 1840, leaders of the city continuously tried to allocate funds for a permanent stone structure.

The building

In 1878 the Szeged Theatrical Association was founded to raise funds for a future theatre. The huge reconstruction after the disastrous flood of 1879, that literally wiped the city, helped this effort. After the city council agreed upon the plans, construction began on the site bordered by the Vörösmarty, Deák Ferenc and Wesselényi streets in 1882. Used scenery for the theatre was bought from the tragically burned Ring Theatre of Vienna. The opening was on 14 October 1883, in the presence of Emperor Franz Joseph I.

18 months after the opening, on 22 April 1885 the theatre was burned down. However, reconstruction was swift. The Fellner & Helmer company modified the previous plans to decrease the fire-hazard, and also made smaller alterations to the outer shape of the building. Historical theatre's ceiling decorations were painted in 1885 by the famous Vienna court painter Hermann von Kern (1839-1912). The rebuilt theatre was opened on 2 October 1886.

After 100 years of its opening, the theatre was renovated in 1978-86.

The Kisszínház
Modifying the former Craftsmen's Association House originally built in 1929, the Kisszínház, with a capacity of 281 seats was opened in 1977 as the chamber theatre of the National Theatre of Szeged. The building was renovated and further extended in 2005.

Sources
János, Sándor. A szegedi színjátszás krónikája - A kőszínház és társulatainak története, 1883-1944. Szeged : Bába Kiadó, 2003. 
Igor Kovačevič, chief ed. Beyond everydayness - Theatre architecture in Central Europe, p. 176-181. Publ. by the National Theatre, Prague, 2010. 
History of Theatre in Szeged and National Theatre of Szeged in the Hungarian Theatrical Lexicon (György, Székely. Magyar Színházművészeti Lexikon. Budapest: Akadémiai Kiadó, 1994. ), freely available on mek.oszk.hu

External links
 Official website of the National Theatre of Szeged

Theatres in Szeged
Organisations based in Szeged
Buildings and structures in Csongrád-Csanád County
Tourist attractions in Csongrád-Csanád County
Fellner & Helmer buildings
Theatres completed in 1883